Robert Thornton may refer to:

Politics
 Robert Stirton Thornton (1863–1936), Manitoba politician
 Robert L. Thornton (1880–1964), American businessman, philanthropist, and mayor of Dallas, Texas
 Robert Y. Thornton (1910–2003), American attorney and politician

Sports
 Robert Thornton (sailor) (born 1941), Australian sailor
 Bob Thornton (born 1962), American basketball player
 Robert Thornton (darts player) (born 1967), Scottish darts player
 Robert Thornton (jockey) (born 1978), English National Hunt jockey

Other
 Robert Thornton (scribe) (died 1460), English scribe and compiler of manuscripts
 Robert John Thornton (1768–1837), English physician and writer on botany
 Robert Lyste Thornton (1908–1985), English/American physicist
 Robert Thornton (explorer)

See also
 Thornton (surname)